Buckholt may refer to:
Buckholt, Hampshire, England
Buckholt, Monmouthshire, Wales

See also
Buckholts, Texas, USA